Eliza Szonert (born 29 January 1974) is an Australian actress. Born in Victoria, Australia, Szonert played Danni Stark in Australia's long-running soap opera Neighbours from 1993 to 1996. Szonert reprised the role in 2005 for the show's 20th anniversary.

After leaving Neighbours, she relocated to Los Angeles, taking parts in various television series, including Buffy The Vampire Slayer spin-off Angel. Whilst there she married an American businessman, and had three daughters. Szonert also played Janine Kellerman in the Australian film The Dish in 2000. She had a minor role in Stingers and has acted on stage. Szonert then played Trish Moran on the Australian television show Underbelly. After divorcing, she moved home to Melbourne, where she started a relationship with an Australian businessman, with whom she had one son.

References

External links

Australian film actresses
Australian stage actresses
1974 births
Living people
Australian soap opera actresses